The Olympus Pen E-P2 announced on 5 November 2009 is Olympus Corporation's second camera that adheres to the Micro Four Thirds (MFT) system design standard.  The E-P2 succeeds the Olympus Pen E-P1 a little over five months after the introduction of the EP-1.

Features
The EP-2 addresses some of the concerns that critics had about the EP-1: slow autofocus speed and difficulty seeing the LCD panel under certain (e.g., bright, sunny) conditions.

The autofocus speed was addressed with a firmware update, and the introduction of new lenses, although critically, the autofocus speed does not improve much with the originally issued 14–42 mm ƒ/3.5–5.6 kit zoom lens (28–90 mm equivalent), or the 17 mm ƒ/2.8 (34 mm equivalent) pancake lens.

The EP-2 added an Accessory Port, a power and communication port, which allowed the use of various accessories, such as an external stereo microphone for HD video recording.  However, the principal use of the accessory port was a new, high resolution, optional hotshoe mounted VF-2 electronic viewfinder (EVF).  The VF-2 had a flip angle eyepiece, allowing viewing from 0–90 degrees.  The high resolution VF-2 had specifications that matched the highly acclaimed built-in EVF on the Panasonic Lumix DMC-G1, the first MFT camera ever introduced.

In the United States the E-P2 MSRP with 14–42 mm kit zoom lens, and VF-2 EVF, was US$1,100.  The accessory VF-2 EVF was also available separately for $280.00. Available body colors were black and silver.

Differences from predecessor
The primary differences between the E-P2 as compared to the E-P1 which it replaced are:
 Addition of an Accessory Port that can be used for an electronic viewfinder or external microphone
 Two new Art filters-simulating Diorama and Cross process in camera
 Black finish widely available, silver finish available in Japan
 Auto focus tracking
 Colour boosting function named i-Enhance

Successor Model 

The E-P2 was replaced in Olympus' PEN line by the Olympus PEN E-P3 which was announced in June 2011.

See also
 Olympus PEN E-PL1

References

External links

 Olympus PEN EP-2 Product Site

PEN E-P2
Live-preview digital cameras
Cameras introduced in 2009